Ooh I Love You Rakeem is an extended play that Robert Diggs released on Tommy Boy Records in 1991 under the name Prince Rakeem. Diggs is best known as RZA, the de facto leader and primary producer of Wu-Tang Clan.

Track listing 

1991 EPs
Albums produced by Easy Mo Bee
Albums produced by RZA
Tommy Boy Records EPs